The Tachikawa Ki-77 was a Japanese very long-range experimental transport and communications aircraft of World War II derived from a design commissioned by a newspaper to break the flight distance record set by a rival. It was a low-wing cabin monoplane with twin piston engines and a tailwheel undercarriage.

Development 
The Ki-77 was the Japanese Army Air Force designation for the A-26, a clean, slim low-wing, twin-engine monoplane intended for an endurance flight between New York and Tokyo. The A stood for the name of the sponsor, a newspaper Asahi Shimbun which was vying for records with a rival paper that had sponsored the Mitsubishi Ki-15 Kamikaze flight to the United Kingdom in 1937. 26 was for the 26th century of the Japanese Imperial Dynasty - 1940 was year 2600 in the Japanese calendar.

The Ki-77's overall design was developed under the aegis of Dr. Hidemasa Kimura of the Aeronautical Research Institute of the University of Tokyo, with Tachikawa Aircraft Company being responsible for manufacturing and detail drafting work. The aircraft's layout was finalized in autumn of 1940 with its first flight originally expected in late 1941, but this was canceled with the start of war against the United States and consequent reallocation of priorities. The Ki-77 design included a number of novel features, including a high aspect ratio laminar flow wing for reduced drag, a sealed but unpressurized cabin to reduce the need for oxygen masks at its intended operating altitude, and special low drag cowlings.

Flight from Japan to Germany 
In response to a flight made by an Italian Savoia-Marchetti S.M.75GA which flew to Japan in July 1942 with stops in Russia and China, the Japanese decided to forge a link with Europe, but wished to avoid Soviet-controlled airspace. The easiest route was that taken by the Italians, following the great circle route, but General Tojo opposed this because it implied a violation of Soviet airspace. Japan was not at war with the Soviets and Tojo wished to avoid either provoking them or asking their permission. Development work was restarted on the A-26/Ki-77 project, and the first of two prototypes flew on 18 November 1942. The prototype suffered from persistent oil cooling problems which required many changes before being solved, delaying further flights into July 1943; while working on these engineering issues, Tachikawa built a second aircraft.

Colonel Saigo considered the so-named "Seiko" (Success) mission absurd and suicidal, but the crew was aware of the hazards of the mission; they even had a personal dose of poison to kill themselves if forced down in enemy territory. The pilot was Juukou Nagatomo, the co-pilot was Hajime Kawasaki, Kenji Tsukagoshi and Noriyoshi Nagata were flight engineers, and Motohiko Kawashima was the radio operator. Three Army officers were also carried as passengers, two of whom were military attachés. They departed Japan on 30 June 1943 for Singapore, where the airstrip had to be lengthened by 1,000 meters to assure a safe takeoff. Finally, the aircraft took off at 7:10 on 7 July 1943 with eight tons of fuel, ample to reach Europe.

Their intended destination was the German airfield at Sarabus (now Hvardiiske, Crimea, .) but they were to disappear over the Indian Ocean. British fighters likely intercepted them as they were aware of the flight and its route (via air grid squares 3420, 2560 and 2510) thanks to the ULTRA analysts at Bletchley Park decoding intercepted German communications to Sarabus warning of their impending arrival. Slow, unarmed, without armour protection and with a substantial amount of fuel on board, the Ki-77 would have been vulnerable to Allied fighters, even had no mechanical problems occurred.

Endurance record flight 
Japan carried out a second flight to gain an endurance record and to verify the Ki-77's capabilities. The existing record had been held by Italy's Savoia-Marchetti SM.75GA since 1939. 

Even if the usefulness of record breaking flights was overshadowed in 1944 by the necessities of war, the Japanese needed a propaganda coup and the surviving Ki-77 was available.

The distance record Ki-77 aircraft was still in existence when Japan surrendered and was shipped to the United States aboard the United States Navy escort carrier  from Yokosuka in December 1945, arriving at Alameda, California on 8 January 1946 for examination before being scrapped.

Operator 

Imperial Japanese Army Air Service

Specifications (Tachikawa Ki-77)

See also
 Messerschmitt Me 261 Adolfine

References

Notes

Bibliography
 Francillon, René J. Japanese Aircraft of the Pacific War. London: Putnam Aeronautical, 1979. . (new edition 1987. .)
 Nakazawa, Akinori and Strippoli, Roberta, '1942-43: Italiani e Giapponesi in volo per rafforzare l'Asse Roma-Tokyo', Rivista Storica magazine Coop Giornalisti Storici, Rome, n.7/94, p. 48-53

Ki-77
1940s Japanese experimental aircraft
Low-wing aircraft
Aircraft first flown in 1942
Twin piston-engined tractor aircraft